Olav Thon (born 29 June 1923) is a Norwegian real estate developer. His Olav Thon Group is Norway's largest private real estate company, with 450 properties, including 60 hotels.

His authorized biography, Olav Thon: Billionaire in a Parka, was written by Hallgrim Berg, a Norwegian politician and a folk musician; a translated version was published in English in October 2009.

Personal 
Thon lives just outside Oslo, in Sollihøgda, Hole municipality. Thon is a Christian and is married but does not have any heirs. He grew up as a "farm boy who only went to the city to sell fox pelts". He enjoys various outdoor activities and is an honorary member of the Norwegian Trekking Association. Thon is "proud of his success, and his large tax bill, which he says he is glad to pay".

Thon was appointed honorary doctorate at Karlstad University in 2013.

Business
Olav Thon bought his first building in 1951 and opened his first restaurant in 1966. His company owns a total of 450 properties in Norway, including shopping malls, office buildings, retail stores, and hotels. His principal holdings are the private companies Stormgård AS and Thongård AS, in addition to a major stake in the publicly traded company Olav Thon Eiendomsselskap ASA.

Trust 
In an article in the Norwegian newspaper Dagens Næringsliv on 10 September 2008, Olav Thon's solicitor, John Christian Elden, announced that Olav Thon intends to give away his entire fortune through the establishment of an independent foundation that focuses on the medical sciences. On 10 December 2013 he announced the decision for the entire 71.9% stake  in his real estate company Olav Thon Eiendomsselskap ASA to give for charity trust of his own. Therefore, later, in February 2014, his personal assets estimated around US$1 billion.

Thon has no heirs.

Personal life 
Thon was married to Inger-Johanne Thon untik her death in 2018. Although he lived with his partner,  Sissel Bergal Haga, for over 30 years, he did not divorce his wife, as she was suffering from Alzheimers.

Thon married his long-time partner,  Sissel Berdal Haga on 21 June 2019.

References

Further reading

External links

1923 births
Living people
Norwegian Lutherans
Norwegian company founders
Norwegian businesspeople in real estate
Norwegian billionaires
Norwegian hoteliers
Norwegian philanthropists
People from Ål